Eugene Jarecki (born October 5, 1969) is an American filmmaker and author. He is best known as a two-time winner of the Sundance Grand Jury Prize, as well as multiple Emmy and Peabody Awards, for his films Why We Fight, Reagan, and The House I Live In.

His other films include The Trials of Henry Kissinger, Freakonomics, The Opponent, and Quest of the Carib Canoe. His most recent feature, The King, was nominated for two Emmys in 2020, including Best Documentary Feature, and a 2019 Grammy Award for Best Music Film of the Year.

Jarecki is also the author of The American Way of War: Guided Missiles, Misguided Men, and a Republic in Peril (Simon & Schuster).

Early life and education
Jarecki was born in New Haven, Connecticut to Henry Jarecki and Gloria Jarecki, a former film critic at Time magazine. Jarecki grew up in New York with his brothers Andrew Jarecki (The Jinx, Capturing the Friedmans) and Thomas A. Jarecki. They also have a half-brother Nicholas Jarecki (Arbitrage). All four brothers are in the film industry, most notably Andrew who has also won the Sundance Grand Jury Prize and Emmy award for his own films and series.

After graduating from the Hackley School in 1987, Eugene attended Princeton University. There he trained as a stage director, but pivoted into film, where he experienced early success. His first short film, Season of the Lifterbees, premiered at the 1993 Sundance Film Festival and won the Time Warner Grand Prize at the Aspen Film Festival.

Career

Film and television
In 2000, Jarecki directed two feature films. One was the documentary Quest of the Carib Canoe, which documents an effort by indigenous Carib Indians on the Island of Dominica to build an ancient ocean-going canoe and retrace their ancestors' path from South America's Orinoco Delta in what is now modern Guyana to the islands of the Caribbean. His second film that year was a dramatic feature called The Opponent released by Lionsgate.

In 2002, his first theatrical documentary feature The Trials of Henry Kissinger was released. Based on the book The Trial of Henry Kissinger by  Christopher Hitchens, this film is the first of Jarecki's sweeping indictments of the perils of power. Trials was selected to launch both the Sundance Channel's DOCday venture as well as the BBC's digital channel, BBC Four. Ultimately, the film has been broadcast in over thirty countries.

Winner of the 2002 Amnesty International Award, the film was nominated for an Independent Spirit Award and  In 2002,

In 2005, Jarecki distinguished himself as a filmmaker unafraid of serious, penetrating investigations. His film Why We Fight about the role of America's military-industrial complex in leading the nation into the tragic quagmire of the Iraq War, won the Sundance Grand Jury Prize and a Peabody Award. He also received a nomination for Best Documentary Screenplay from the Writers Guild of America for the film.

Alongside directors Alex Gibney, Morgan Spurlock, and Rachel Grady, Jarecki directed a segment of the 2010 feature Freakonomics based on the 2005 book Freakonomics: A Rogue Economist Explores the Hidden Side of Everything by Steven D. Levitt and Stephen J. Dubner. The film premiered at the Tribeca Film Festival that year.

In 2011, Jarecki returned to the Sundance Film Festival with his Emmy Award-winning film Reagan, before its national television release on HBO on what would have been the 40th President's 100th birthday. The next year, The House I Live In, his film about America's War on Drugs, won Jarecki a second Grand Jury Prize at Sundance as well as a second Peabody Award. Achieving a level of mainstream recognition, the film's producers included Danny Glover, John Legend, Brad Pitt, and Russell Simmons. In order to create a genuine impact, the film was exhibited in over 130 U.S. prisons, churches, and statehouses, as well as on Capitol Hill. Along with the music video of the same name, featuring John Legend, and the viral short Just Say No...to the War on Drugs, (both directed by Jarecki), the film is credited with changing the national conversation on U.S. drug policy.

In 2014, Jarecki took part in the first Ted Talk in the history of Cuba at Havana's Teatro Nacional. Events that occurred in the days leading up to the talk became the subject of Jarecki's 2016 short film, The Cyclist (El Ciclista) which he directed for The New Yorker/Amazon.

In 2015, Jarecki served as executive producer on the documentary feature film (T)ERROR, directed by Lyric Cabral and David Felix Sutcliff, which won Jarecki a Sundance Special Jury Prize and his second Emmy Award. That same year, he also executive produced Laura Israel's feature documentary Don't Blink – Robert Frank about the late legendary photographer's work and career.

His most recent film, The King, produced by Steven Soderbergh, Errol Morris, and Rosanne Cash, premiered at Cannes and Sundance. Nominated for a Grammy Award for Best Music Film, The King is a musical road trip in Elvis Presley's 1963 Rolls-Royce that features Alec Baldwin, Chuck D, Emmylou Harris, Mike Myers, Rosanne Cash, Van Jones, and Ethan Hawke, among others, tracing the rise and fall of Elvis as a metaphor for the country he left behind. Alongside the film, Jarecki created a series of music videos for artists such as Lana Del Rey, M. Ward, The Handsome Family, Immortal Technique, and the Stax Music Academy All-Stars.

In 2018, Jarecki's first public contemporary art exhibit, entitled Promised Land, was featured at Miami Art Basel as part of "This is Not America" at the Faena Hotel, Miami Beach. A multiscreen video presentation, Promised Land was inspired by Jarecki's 2018 film, The King.

In 2019, it was announced that Jarecki is returning to dramatic filmmaking with a yet-untitled action film about a Saharan, Tuareg nomad, who seeks revenge for a crime committed against his tribal customs. Jarecki wrote the screenplay with his son Jonas Jarecki, based on a best-selling novel. Addison O'Dea is producing.

Public policy 
As a public intellectual on U.S. domestic and international policy, Jarecki has appeared on a variety of national television programs including The Daily Show, The Colbert Report, Real Time with Bill Maher, Fox & Friends, and Charlie Rose. In 2010, he created the short film Move Your Money, encouraging Americans to move their banking from "too big to fail" banks into smaller community banks and credit unions. It became a viral sensation leading to an estimated 4 million Americans moving their money out of major banks. 

Jarecki is also the Founder and Executive director of The Eisenhower Project, an academic public policy group, dedicated, in the spirit of Dwight D. Eisenhower, to studying the forces that shape American foreign policy. He has been a visiting fellow at Brown University's Watson Institute for International Studies and is the author of The American Way of War (2008), published by Simon & Schuster/Free Press.

Jarecki has also participated as a speaker at several international conferences including Ted, Nantucket Project, and will.i.am's "TRANS4M" gathering for the i.am.angel Foundation.

At the 2014 Nantucket Project, Jarecki conducted a public interview with WikiLeaks editor-in-chief Julian Assange as a hologram, beamed in to Nantucket from his place of asylum at the Ecuadorian Embassy in London.

Jarecki wrote in The Guardian before the event, "it crosses my mind I may be abetting a crime or violating international extradition laws. But I reassure myself that, in this regard, the worldwide web remains a kind of wild wild west, and the virtual escape of a person is not (yet?) a crime."

As a sequel to this interview, Jarecki publicly interviewed former U.S. Army soldier Chelsea Manning at the 2017 Nantucket Project, after her 35-year prison sentence was commuted by President Obama. In The Guardian, Jarecki wrote, "Manning sees connections in the duty of the soldier who uncovers high crimes, to the death of secrecy in the digital age, to the role of the individual in a society where privacy is as besieged as sexual orientation."

In April 2020 Jarecki created the Trump Death Clock, a 56-foot billboard in Times Square, New York City, that shows a daily estimate of the total portion of U.S COVID-19 deaths resulting from President Trump and his administration's delayed response to the pandemic. The website www.TrumpDeathClock.com provides an up-to-the minute estimate. Visitors can learn more about the human cost of the administration's inaction between March 9 and 16, 2020, which epidemiologists have identified as a crucial period in the virus' exponential spread. The site reached over 200,000 visits in just its first few days of operation, and Jarecki published a Washington Post editorial explaining the math epidemiology behind the Clock's design.

Filmography

Awards and nominations

See also

Interviews 
The Brooklyn Rail: "The Nature of the System/It's the System Not the Man: Eugene Jarecki in conversation with Williams Cole" 
New York Magazine: "Childhood in New York", featuring Jarecki
a BBC Storyville interview
a BBC World interview
on The Daily Show with Jon Stewart
on The Charlie Rose Show
on The Colbert Report

Full films 
Why We Fight – Google Video, 1 hr 39 min 1 sec
The Trials of Henry Kissinger  – Google Video, 1 hr 19 min 41 sec
Move Your Money short film on YouTube

Bibliography
The American Way of War: Guided Missiles, Misguided Men, and a Republic in Peril (Simon & Schuster, 2008)

References

External links

Living people
American documentary filmmakers
Film directors from New York City
American people of German-Jewish descent
Princeton University alumni
New York University alumni
Hackley School alumni
People from New Haven, Connecticut
Film directors from Connecticut
1969 births